, known professionally as , is a Japanese actor best known for his uncredited portrayal of the title character in the 1966 series Ultraman. Furuya would later portray the character Amagi in the sequel series Ultraseven. Furuya has also made appearances in Mothra (1961), Gorath (1962), High and Low (1963), Ghidorah, the Three-Headed Monster (1964), Ultraman Zearth (1996), Mega Monster Battle: Ultra Galaxy (2009), and Shin Ultraman (2022).

Life 

Furuya was born in Nishiazabu, Minato, Tokyo, the fifth son of a door merchant. When he was young, he often went to watch movies at a nearby temple. After finishing middle school, Furuya studied acting at Toho Geino School. He was inspired by actors Akira Takarada and Yūjirō Ishihara to pursue a career in acting.

In 1960, he entered Toho. His first role in a motion picture was in the 1961 film Mothra. He began his career as a crowd actor for Toho.

At the age of 22, in 1966, Furuya was chosen for the role as a suit actor to portray an alien named Kemur in Ultra Q. His height at 181 cm (5 ft 11 in), slim body and body type "different from regular Japanese people in the 1960s" are said to have matched with the requirements for the role. At first, he refused to take the role because he was embarrassed to wear the costume, but gave in after being persuaded by the movie staff.

His Japanese-language autobiography, The Man Who Became Ultraman, was published in 2009.

Filmography

Film

Television

References

External links 

 

1943 births
Living people
Japanese male actors
20th-century Japanese male actors
21st-century Japanese male actors